Goodbye Broadway is a 1938 American film.  The movie is based on the play The Shannons of Broadway written by actor (and ex-vaudevillian) James Gleason. A previous film had been made of the play entitled The Shannons of Broadway.

Plot
Molly and Pat Malloy, a married couple of famed vaudeville performers on the verge of retirement, arrive in a small Connecticut town to play a show, When they're insulted by the clerk of the shabby local hotel, the Malloys buy the hotel just for the satisfaction of firing him.  But this aggravates the local realtor who's had his eye on the property.  For revenge, the realtor places an ad in Variety that the Malloys are providing free room and board for any of their eccentric old vaudeville friends who might show up.  Many do.

Cast

 Alice Brady as Molly Malloy
 Charles Winninger as Pat Malloy
 Tom Brown as Chuck Bradford
 Dorothea Kent as Jeanne Carlyle
 Frank Jenks as Harry Clark
 Jed Prouty as J.A. Higgins
 Willie Best as Jughead
 Donald Meek as Iradius P. Oglethorpe
 Henry Roquemore as Henry Swanzey
 Dell Henderson as Cromwell
 unbilled players include Fern Emmett and Edward Gargan

External links
 
 Turner Classic Movies page

1938 films
Films directed by Ray McCarey
Universal Pictures films
1938 comedy films
American comedy films
American black-and-white films
American films based on plays
1930s American films